The Londonderry and Enniskillen Railway (L&ER) was an Irish gauge railway in Ireland.

Construction and opening
The Londonderry and Enniskillen Railway was incorporated in 1845. Construction began at Derry and followed the west bank of the River Foyle southwards  to Strabane, which was reached in 1847. The L&ER's terminus in Derry was  station on the west bank of the River Foyle.

The line reached its summit at Fintona, County Tyrone, in 1853. Fintona Junction was just north of the town of Fintona, leaving the short stretch from the Junction to the town as a small branch line.

In 1859 the Dundalk and Enniskillen Railway (D&ER) reached Enniskillen, connecting the D&ER with Dundalk on the Irish Sea. Omagh became a junction in September 1861 when the Portadown, Dungannon and Omagh Junction Railway reached it from the east. The Ulster Railway worked the PD&O, giving Omagh a link with Belfast.

Operation and takeover
In 1862 the D&ER renamed itself the Irish North Western Railway (INW). In 1876 the INW merged with the Northern Railway of Ireland and the Ulster Railway to form the Great Northern Railway (GNR). The L&ER's lease continued and the company remained separate until the GNR absorbed it in 1883.

In 1857 a cow strayed onto the line near  and was hit and killed by the mail train to Omagh. Afterwards the Board of Trade Inspector criticised the condition of the track, which had been laid only a decade earlier. Both were attributed to the poor condition of the permanent way. In 1876 the crossing-keeper's wife was killed by a mail train and in 1883 a train hit a horse and cart, killing the horse. After the second accident the Board of Trade ordered the railway to replace the crossing with a bridge.

After takeover
Under the Great Northern the former L&ER developed in three sections. The Belfast and Northern Counties Railway's competing route via  was shorter, quicker and attracted more passenger traffic, but the Derry Road carried more freight. Traffic grew to the extent that by 1907 the GNR had installed double track between Foyle Road and St. Johnston, but in 1932 it was singled again.

The Omagh – Enniskillen line via Fintona Junction became a secondary route, and in 1957 the Government of Northern Ireland closed it. The short branch to Fintona became famous as the GNR worked it with a horse tram. Since the line's closure, the tram has been preserved at the Ulster Folk and Transport Museum at Cultra, County Down.

In 1958 the governments of Northern Ireland and the Republic of Ireland partitioned the GNR between them and the Derry Road became part of the Ulster Transport Authority (UTA). The line was closed in February 1965.

Footnotes

Sources

Railway companies established in 1845
Railway companies disestablished in 1883
Irish gauge railways
Great Northern Railway (Ireland)
Closed railways in Northern Ireland
Defunct railway companies of Ireland
Transport in County Donegal
Transport in County Fermanagh
Transport in County Londonderry
Transport in County Tyrone
1845 establishments in Ireland
1883 disestablishments in Ireland